The 1939 Cotton Bowl Classic was the third edition of the postseason college football bowl game, between the St. Mary's Gaels and the Texas Tech Red Raiders.

Background
Texas Tech was undefeated and ranked eleventh in the final AP poll (released in early December). Sportswriters had tagged the California-based Gaels as a "Cinderella" team, due to their tawdry  record, though the two blemishes were by narrow margins to ranked teams on the road. It was the first bowl game for unranked St. Mary's and the second for Texas Tech, which played in the previous season's Sun Bowl.

Game summary
Texas Tech committed eight turnovers in the game; five interceptions and three fumbles. Entering the fourth quarter, the Gaels led  with a touchdown scored in each quarter; runs by Ed Heffernan and Michael Klotovich in the first half and Whitey Smith's interception return in the third quarter.

Texas Tech scored twice in the fourth quarter on touchdown catches by Elmer Tarbox and E.J. McKnight from Gene Barnett. The extra point on the second score was blocked and the score was  Tech nearly tied the game when George Webb caught a pass from Barnett, heading for daylight until Lou Rimassa stopped him in St. Mary's territory. But Tech could only advance to St. Mary's 15-yard line and they failed to score; St. Mary's held on to win in one of the biggest upsets in college football history.

Statistics

Aftermath
St. Mary's played in two more bowl games, in the mid-1940s, and lost both. The program was dropped in 1951 and later returned joined Division II, and moved up to Division I-AA in the 1990s; the football program was discontinued prior to the 2004 season. Texas Tech did not reach a Cotton Bowl again until 1995; the Red Raiders have yet to win in four appearances.

References

Cotton Bowl Classic
Cotton Bowl Classic
Saint Mary's Gaels football bowl games
Texas Tech Red Raiders football bowl games
Cotton Bowl
January 1939 sports events